Presidential elections were held in Mali on 28 April 2002, with a run-off on 12 May. The previous president, Alpha Oumar Konaré, stood down after 10 years in office, having been term limited by the Malian constitution to two terms. Amadou Toumani Touré won the election with 65% of the vote in the second round.

Candidates
Twenty-four candidates were certified by the Constitutional Court and stood in the election.  Only one candidate, a woman who would have been the country's first female presidential candidate if she had been allowed to run, was prevented from standing for election after failing to provide the deposit of approximately $7,000.

Electoral system
In order to register to contest the elections, candidates had to provide a deposit of approximately $7,000. This was returned if the candidate won over 5% of the vote in the first round. Each candidate was entitled to have a representative at each of the 12,400 polling booths.

The election was held using the two-round system, with a second round held as none of the candidates received over 50% of the vote in the first round.

Conduct
Overall, international observers said the election was well managed and transparent; however, there were many procedural irregularities.
After the first round of voting, the Constitutional Court cancelled over 500,000 of the ballots due to problems such as unregistered voters and missing election reports.

Results

References

External links
Regional results of second round Electoral Geography
Post-election Statement on Mali Elections, June 7, 2002 Carter Center
Provisional results

Presidential elections in Mali
Mali
2002 in Mali
April 2002 events in Africa